October Mountain State Forest is a  forest and recreational preserve located primarily in the town of Washington with adjoining parcels in Becket, Lee, and Lenox. It is the largest state forest in Massachusetts and is managed by the Massachusetts Department of Conservation and Recreation.

History
The forest came into state ownership via the estate of William C. Whitney, President Grover Cleveland's Secretary of the Navy. The purchase of the initial  was made in 1915 for a total of $60,000, part of which came through the pledge of a group of Berkshire residents. The area was opened to the public that year. The name "October Mountain" is said to have been bestowed by author Herman Melville, whose home in Pittsfield overlooked the area.

Activities and amenities
Forest trails are available for hiking, mountain biking, cross-country skiing, and off-road vehicle use. Trails include a  interpretive trail around Washington Mountain Marsh, a portion of the Appalachian Trail, and a trail through scenic Schermerhorn Gorge. The forest has 47 campsites including wheelchair-accessible sites. Recreational opportunities include non-motorized boating, fishing, and restricted hunting.

Geography
The forest encompasses a portion of the Hoosac Range on the western edge of the central Berkshires.  The eponymous October Mountain is a ridge that rises steeply above the Housatonic River valley to the west and contains the forest's highest point.  The central portion of the forest is an uplands area that includes several reservoirs, and the Washington Mountain Marsh.  The eastern edge of the forest has a second, lower ridge, known as Washington Mountain.

References

External links
October Mountain State Forest Department of Conservation and Recreation

Massachusetts state forests
Protected areas of Berkshire County, Massachusetts
Campgrounds in Massachusetts
Protected areas established in 1915
1915 establishments in Massachusetts